"Lågsus" is a song performed by Danish hip-hop group Specktors, released as the second single from their second studio album Kadavermarch (2012). It was released on 9 July 2012 as a digital download in Denmark on iTunes. The song features vocals from Danish pop, dance and R&B singer and songwriter Medina. The song peaked at number 1 on the Danish Singles Chart.

Track listing

Chart performance

Release history

References

2012 singles
2012 songs
EMI Records singles